Harrisonville Telephone Company was founded in Waterloo, Illinois in 1896, and provides communications to southwestern Illinois.  HTC is the 6th largest telephone company in Illinois. HTC contains the IP Block 65.87.32.0 - 65.87.63.255 and 216.114.96.0 - 216.114.127.255.  HTC is a Tier-2 Internet Service Provider getting their bandwidth from AT&T. HTC offers broadband as well as fiber internet.

References

External links

1896 establishments in Illinois
Companies based in Monroe County, Illinois
American companies established in 1896
Telecommunications companies established in 1896
Telecommunications companies of the United States
Waterloo, Illinois